Loomis, New York may refer to the following places:

 Loomis, Delaware County, New York, a hamlet
 Loomis, Sullivan County, New York, a place in New York